The 2017 New York Red Bulls season was the club's twenty-second season in Major League Soccer, the top division of soccer in the United States.

Team information

Squad information

Appearances and goals are career totals from all-competitions.

Roster transactions

In

Out

Draft picks

Preseason and Friendlies

Friendlies

Statistics
2 Goals

 Sacha Kljestan

1 Goal

 Brandon Allen
 Lucas Terci
 Vincent Bezecourt
 Gonzalo Verón
 Omir Fernandez
 Sal Zizzo

Major League Soccer season

Eastern Conference

Overall

Results summary

Matches

MLS Cup Playoffs

Knockout round

Eastern Conference Semifinals

CONCACAF Champions League

2016–17

Group stage 
Group stage matches were played during the 2016 New York Red Bulls season.

Quarterfinals

2017–18 

New York will enter the competition during Phase Two in 2018.

U.S. Open Cup

New York entered the 2017 U.S. Open Cup with the rest of Major League Soccer in the fourth round.

Player statistics

As of 5 November 2017.

|-
! colspan="14" style="background:#dcdcdc; text-align:center"| Goalkeepers

|-
! colspan="14" style="background:#dcdcdc; text-align:center"| Defenders

|-
! colspan="14" style="background:#dcdcdc; text-align:center"| Midfielders

|-
! colspan="14" style="background:#dcdcdc; text-align:center"| Forwards

|-
! colspan="14" style="background:#dcdcdc; text-align:center"| Left Club During Season

Top scorers

As of 5 November 2017.

Assist Leaders

As of 5 November 2017.
This table does not include secondary assists.

Shutouts 

As of 5 November 2017.

References

New York Red Bulls
New York Red Bulls
New York Red Bulls
New York Red Bulls seasons